Down by Law is a 1986 American black-and-white independent film written and directed by Jim Jarmusch and starring Tom Waits, John Lurie, and Roberto Benigni.

The film centers on the arrest, incarceration, and escape from jail of three men. It discards jailbreak film conventions by focusing on the interaction between the convicts rather than on the mechanics of the escape. A key element in the film is Robby Müller's slow-moving camerawork, which captures the architecture of New Orleans and the Louisiana bayou to which the cellmates escape.

Plot summary
Three men, previously unknown to each other, are arrested in New Orleans and placed in the same cell. Both Zack (Waits), a disc jockey, and Jack (Lurie), a pimp, have been set up, neither having committed the crime for which they have been arrested. Their cellmate Bob (Benigni, in his first international role), an Italian tourist who understands minimal English, was imprisoned for accidental manslaughter.

Zack and Jack soon come to blows and thereafter avoid speaking to each other. Bob has an irrepressible need for conversation. He hatches a plan to escape, and before long the three are on the run through the swamp surrounding the prison. Hopelessly lost and with a simmering hatred between Jack and Zack almost causing the party to split up, they are brought together by Bob's ability to provide food. The trio eventually chances across a house in the forest, the residence of Nicoletta (Braschi). Bob and Nicoletta instantly fall in love, and Bob decides to stay with her in the forest. Zack and Jack go their separate ways—an unspoken, begrudging friendship hanging between them as they part.

Cast

 Tom Waits as Zack
 John Lurie as Jack
 Roberto Benigni as Roberto
 Nicoletta Braschi as Nicoletta
 Ellen Barkin as Laurette
 Billie Neal as Bobbie
 Rockets Redglare as Gig
 Vernel Bagneris as Preston
 Timothea as Julie
 L.C. Drane as L.C.
 Joy N. Houck, Jr. as Detective Mandino
 Carrie Lindsoe as Young Girl
 Ralph Joseph as Detective
 Richard Boes as Detective
 Dave Petitjean as Cajun Detective

Production
The cinematography is by Robby Müller, who subsequently worked with Jarmusch on Mystery Train (1989), Dead Man (1995), and Ghost Dog: The Way of the Samurai (1999). The film stars musician Tom Waits, along with Jarmusch regulars John Lurie and Roberto Benigni. Benigni and Nicoletta Braschi, whose characters fall in love in the movie, later got married in real life.

Release and reviews
Down by Law was entered into the 1986 Cannes Film Festival. It was dedicated to Pascale Ogier and Enzo Ungari.

The film has an 87% approval rating on Rotten Tomatoes, based on 30 reviews, with an average rating of 7.61/10. The website's consensus reads, "Funny, original, and thoroughly cinematic, Down by Law represents writer-director Jim Jarmusch at his most ingratiating and evocative." A reviewer for The New York Times called it a "fable of poetic density", with "extraordinary performances" by the three main actors. Roger Ebert of The Chicago Sun-Times gave the film three stars out of a possible four. He said Down By Law was overlong, but with an undercurrent of sly humor that balanced out the grim material; a "true original that kind of grows on you", and "an anthology of pulp images from the world of film noir."

Soundtrack
The original soundtrack was written and performed by John Lurie, backed with a small jazz ensemble, released as LP on Crammed Discs (Made to Measure, Vol. 14, 1987)
Additional songs featured
"Crying", written by Roy Orbison and Joe Melson, first lines performed by Tom Waits alone in a car as he imagines deejaying, just before he is stopped by police.
"Jockey Full of Bourbon", written and performed by Tom Waits (from the album Rain Dogs, 1985), the whole song plays over otherwise soundless tracking shots of New Orleans neighbourhood streets.
"It's Raining", produced and allegedly written by Allen Toussaint, performed by Irma Thomas. In the breakfast scene Roberto chooses the song from a juke box and dances with Nicoletta to it.
"Tango Till They're Sore", written and performed by Tom Waits (from Rain Dogs), final song.

See also
 List of American films of 1986

References

External links

 
 
 
Down by Law: Chemistry Set an essay by Lucy Sante at the Criterion Collection

1986 films
1980s English-language films
1980s buddy comedy films
1986 independent films
1980s comedy road movies
American black-and-white films
American buddy comedy films
American independent films
American comedy road movies
Films directed by Jim Jarmusch
Films set in Louisiana
Films set in New Orleans
Films shot in New Orleans
Southern Gothic films
Fictional portrayals of the New Orleans Police Department
1986 comedy films
1980s American films